
Gmina Brąszewice is a rural gmina (administrative district) in Sieradz County, Łódź Voivodeship, in central Poland.

Villages
Gmina Brąszewice contains the villages and settlements of Błota, Brąszewice, Bukowiec, Chajew, Chajew-Kolonia, Czartoryja, Gałki, Godynice, Kamieniki, Kosatka, Lisy, Sokolenie, Starce, Trzcinka, Wiertelaki, Wojtyszki, Wólka Klonowska, Zadębieniec, Żuraw and Zwierzyniec.

Neighbouring gminas
Gmina Brąszewice is bordered by the gminas of Błaszki, Brzeziny, Brzeźnio, Czajków, Klonowa, Wróblew and Złoczew.

References
Polish official population figures 2006

Braszewice
Sieradz County